Durey is a surname. Notable people with the surname include:

Louis Durey (1888–1979), French composer
Cyrus Durey (1864–1933), American politician, U.S. Representative from New York
Michael Durey, biographer of James T. Callender
Lincoln Durey, creator of EmperorLinux